Carla Dziwoki (born 29 August 1982) is a former Australian netball player. Dziwoki played with the Queensland Firebirds in the Commonwealth Bank Trophy. She also played for Leeds Carnegie during the 2009–10 Netball Superleague season. Dziwoki rejoined the Queensland Firebirds for the 2009 ANZ Championship season after Megan Dehn withdrew from the side.

Dziwoki also plays in the Netball NSW Premier League where she represents the Sutherland Shire. Dziwoki will also be representing NSW Waratahs in the Australian Netball League. Carla will play for the NSW Swifts in the 2011 ANZ Championship season. She was also a member of the Australian FastNet Diamonds team which played at the 2011 World Netball Series in Liverpool. After being released by the NSW Swifts at the end of the 2014 ANZ Championship season, Dziwoki signed with the Melbourne Vixens for the 2015 season.

In 2018, she became a contestant on an Australian home renovation television show, The Block, along with fellow netballer Bianca Chatfield.

Dziwoki is the daughter of American basketball player Reg Biddings, who spent his professional career in Australia.

National Representation
2011 Australian FastNet team
2013 Australian Fast5 Flyers

Netball Career Facts
2004 Australian Squad
2011 Australian Squad Training Partner
2011 NSW Waratahs Captain, Australian Netball League undefeated premiers
2013 Australian Fast5 Flyers – Silver Medalists
2014 NSW Swifts Leadership Group

References

New South Wales Swifts players
Melbourne Vixens players
1982 births
Living people
Australian netball players
Netball Superleague players
Team Northumbria netball players
Yorkshire Jets players
Queensland Firebirds players
Australian Netball League players
Netball New South Wales Waratahs players
Commonwealth Bank Trophy players
AIS Canberra Darters players
Australia international Fast5 players
Contax Netball Club players
Australian expatriate netball people in England
South Australia state netball league players
Participants in Australian reality television series
Australian people of American descent
New South Wales state netball league players